The red-rumped agouti (Dasyprocta leporina), also known as the golden-rumped agouti, orange-rumped agouti or Brazilian agouti, is a species of agouti from the family Dasyproctidae.

Distribution
It is native to northeastern South America, where found in Venezuela, Guyana, Suriname, French Guiana, northeastern Brazil, Trinidad and Tobago and Saint Lucia in the Caribbean. It has also been introduced to the U.S. Virgin Islands, Grenada, and Dominica.

Names
Despite the alternative name Brazilian agouti, it is neither the only nor the most widespread species of agouti in Brazil. In Brazil all agoutis are often called "cutia" .

Habitat
It is found in a wide range of forests, including rainforest and secondary forest.

Description

The females are larger than males but otherwise look similar. They are brownish with darker spots on the upper body. The fur becomes more orange as it goes past (going down) the middle area of the animal. The ears are somewhat square in shape. The front feet have four toes and the back have three each. They can be distinguished from other agoutis by their distinct coloring.

They have no distinct breeding season, but females come into season twice a year and generally have one to four young. The gestation period is 104 to 120 days.  On average, it takes 20 weeks for the young to be weaned.  They live in pairs or family groups of the parents and babies.  They need large areas for food, breeding, and territory; because of this, keeping them in captivity is difficult.  It lives 15-20 yrs in captivity.

Diet
Food mostly consists of seeds, pulp, leaves, roots and fruits. They also feed on insect larvae when plant resources are low. They are known to feed on and disperse Astrocaryum aculeatissimum seeds, as well as Hymenaea courbaril seeds.

References 

 John F. Eisenberg and Kent H. Redford, 2000. Mammals of Neotropics: Ecuador, Bolivia and Brazil.
 Bricklin, R. and P. Myers. 2004. "Dasyprocta leporina" (On-line), Animal Diversity Web. Accessed December 12, 2006 at ADW: Dasyprocta leporina: CLASSIFICATION

External links 
 
 

Dasyprocta
Mammals of the Caribbean
Mammals of Brazil
Mammals of French Guiana
Mammals of Guyana
Mammals of Suriname
Mammals of Trinidad and Tobago
Mammals of Grenada
Mammals of Dominica
Mammals of Venezuela
Fauna of the Amazon
Fauna of the Guianas
Fauna of the Lesser Antilles
Mammals described in 1758
Taxa named by Carl Linnaeus